Yahia Kébé (born 11 July 1985) is a Burkinabé professional footballer who plays as a striker for Al-Zawraa.

Club career
Kébé began his career in 1999 with US Torcy. He played with the club's youth squad before transferring to Blackburn Rovers in 2003. In 2003 he joined Bordeaux and was promoted to the reserve team 2004 where he played with his brother Boubacar, Kébé who scores 6 goals in 20 games.

In 2005 Kébé moved to FC Libourne Saint-Seurin. In the 2005–06 season he played 21 matches and scored 8 goals and in 2006–07, he made 35 appearances in Ligue 2 scoring 10 goals.

Kébé left Libourne in July 2007 and moved to Troyes AC, where he played 23 games and scored 7 goals in his first season. In the season 2008–09 season he scored 3 goals in 18 games for Troyes in the French Ligue 2.

International career
Kébé represented Burkina Faso national team internationally.

Personal life
His father is Malian and his mother is Burkinabé; he is the elder brother of Boubacar Kébé and sister Asta.

References

External links

Footmercato Stats

1985 births
Living people
Malian footballers
Burkinabé footballers
Burkina Faso international footballers
Burkinabé people of Malian descent
FC Girondins de Bordeaux players
US Torcy players
FC Libourne players
ES Troyes AC players
Ligue 2 players
Association football forwards
Al Kharaitiyat SC players
Qatar Stars League players
Burkinabé expatriate footballers
Expatriate footballers in Qatar
Sportspeople from Ouagadougou
21st-century Burkinabé people